Lithops herrei is a species of succulent plant under the genus Lithops and family Aizoaceae. It derives its name from Adolar Herre, a German botanist of the 20th century.

Description 
The leaves grow in pairs of two and are ivory-white. They have a grey-green pattern on the top of the leaves. Flowers are dark yellow, and emerge from the fissure between the two leaves.

References 

herrei
Taxa named by Louisa Bolus